Alin Vasile Bota (born 29 May 1983) is a Romanian football goalkeeper who plays for Liga III side Minaur Baia Mare. In his career he also played for teams such as: CFR Cluj, CS Otopeni, FC Baia Mare or Gloria Bistrița and is well known for scoring from penalties.

Honours
Baia Mare
Liga III : 2005–06, 2008–09, 2014–15, 2021–22

ACSF Comuna Recea
Liga III : 2019–20

References

External links
 

1983 births
Living people
People from Baia Mare
Romanian footballers
Association football goalkeepers
Liga I players
Liga II players
CFR Cluj players
ACF Gloria Bistrița players
CS Minaur Baia Mare (football) players
CS Academica Recea players